Kangpenqing (also Gang Benchhen) is a mountain in the Baiku Himalayas of Tibet, China. At an elevation of  it is the 90th highest mountain in the world. The peak was first climbed in 1982.

See also
 List of mountains in China

References

Mountains of Tibet
Seven-thousanders of the Himalayas